Castro Marín is the thirteenth studio album by the Spanish composer and guitarist Paco de Lucía. All songs were written by Paco de Lucía.

The title was a tribute to his mother, a Portuguese woman from Castro Marim, in the Algarve region of southern Portugal.

Track listing
"Monasterio de Sal" (Colombiana) – 4:43
"Gitanos Andaluces" (Bulerías) – 4:55
"Castro Marín" (Fandangos) – 4:11
"Herencia" (Soleá) – 5:35
"Convite" (Rumba) [featuring Larry Coryell] – 5:08 
"Palenque" [featuring Larry Coryell & John McLaughlin] – 7:22 
"Huida" – 3:58

Musicians
Paco de Lucía - Flamenco guitar
Larry Coryell - Acoustic guitar
John McLaughlin - Acoustic guitar, 12 string guitar
Carles Benavent - Bass guitar

References

 Gamboa, Manuel José and Nuñez, Faustino. (2003). Paco de Lucía. Madrid:Universal Music Spain.

1981 albums
Paco de Lucía albums